Skamania County is a county located in the U.S. state of Washington. As of the 2020 census, the population was 12,036. The county seat and largest incorporated city is Stevenson, although the Carson River Valley CDP is more populous. Skamania County is included in the Portland-Vancouver-Hillsboro, OR-WA Metropolitan Statistical Area.

History

Etymology
The county was founded in 1854 and derives its name from the Cascades Chinook word sk'mániak, meaning "swift waters".

County beginnings
The area delineated by the future Washington state boundary began to be colonized at the start of the nineteenth century, both by Americans and British subjects. However, the majority of British exploration and interest in the land was due to the fur trade, whereas American settlers were principally seeking land for agriculture and cattle raising. The Treaty of 1818 provided for the region to be an Anglo-American condominium. During this period, the future Washington Territory was divided into two administrative zones: Clark County and Lewis County (made official in 1845).

The condominium was unwieldy and led to continual argument, and occasional conflict. The status of the Washington area was settled in 1846, when the Oregon Treaty ceded the land south of North latitude 49 degrees to American control.

On March 9, 1854, Skamania County was split from the original Clark County. Also in 1854, Walla Walla County was split from the new Skamania County. After that, Skamania County retained its shape, including through the period after Washington became the 42nd state of the Union in 1889. An early county seat was Fort Cascades, built to protect the Columbia River, but the county seat has been in Stevenson since 1893.

20th century to present day
Skamania County is also known for enacting what has been described as the "Bigfoot Ordinance", passed by the Board of County Commissioners at its meeting of April 1, 1969 and published twice in the Skamania County Pioneer, the newspaper of highest circulation in the county, as required by law.  Although its passage coincided with April Fool's Day, Ordinance 69-01 was real, was amended in 1984, and has not been repealed.  Its purposes included protection of residents and visitors from in the county from a very real concern, "an influx of scientific investigators as well as casual hunters, many armed with lethal weapons", who had been attracted to the area by reported sightings of a creature.

Mt. St. Helens, which is located in Skamania County, erupted in 1980.

Geography

Geographic features
Cascade Mountains
Columbia River
Mount St. Helens - the highest point in Skamania County
Indian Heaven

Major highways
 State Route 14
 Wind River Highway

Adjacent counties
Lewis County - north
Yakima County - northeast
Klickitat County - east
Hood River County, Oregon - south
Multnomah County, Oregon - southwest
Clark County - west
Cowlitz County - west

Demographics

2000 census
As of the census of 2000, there were 9,872 people, 3,755 households, and 2,756 families living in the county. The population density was 6 people per square mile (2/km2). There were 4,576 housing units at an average density of 3 per square mile (1/km2). The racial makeup of the county was 92.11% White, 0.30% Black or African American, 2.20% Native American, 0.54% Asian, 0.17% Pacific Islander, 2.43% from other races, and 2.25% from two or more races. 4.03% of the population were Hispanic or Latino of any race. 17.7% were of German, 12.5% English, 12.1% Irish, 11.2% United States or American and 5.2% Norwegian ancestry.

There were 3,755 households, out of which 34.00% had children under the age of 18 living with them, 60.50% were married couples living together, 8.20% had a female householder with no husband present, and 26.60% were non-families. 21.10% of all households were made up of individuals, and 6.60% had someone living alone who was 65 years of age or older. The average household size was 2.61 and the average family size was 3.02.

In the county, the population was spread out, with 26.60% under the age of 18, 6.70% from 18 to 24, 28.60% from 25 to 44, 27.10% from 45 to 64, and 11.00% who were 65 years of age or older. The median age was 39 years. For every 100 females there were 101.30 males. For every 100 females age 18 and over, there were 99.40 males.

The median income for a household in the county was $39,317, and the median income for a family was $44,586. Males had a median income of $36,732 versus $25,130 for females. The per capita income for the county was $18,002. About 10.00% of families and 13.10% of the population were below the poverty line, including 18.10% of those under age 18 and 7.90% of those age 65 or over.

There are more Seventh-day Adventists in Skamania County than members of any other religious group. Skamania County is the only county in the United States for which this is true.

2010 census
As of the 2010 census, there were 11,066 people, 4,522 households, and 3,072 families living in the county. The racial makeup of the county was 92.8% white, 1.6% American Indian, 0.9% Asian, 0.4% black or African American, 0.1% Pacific islander, 1.3% from other races, and 3.0% from two or more races. Those of Hispanic or Latino origin made up 5.0% of the population. In terms of ancestry, 20.6% were German, 15.7% were Irish, 11.0% were English, 6.3% were Norwegian, and 5.0% were American.

Of the 4,522 households, 28.4% had children under the age of 18 living with them, 54.3% were married couples living together, 8.9% had a female householder with no husband present, 32.1% were non-families, and 25.6% of all households were made up of individuals. The average household size was 2.44 and the average family size was 2.92. The median age was 44.0 years.

Recreation
 Skamania County has abundant trails within its borders, including hiking at the Columbia River Gorge and Gifford Pinchot National Forest, which includes the Mount St. Helens National Volcanic Monument. The Pacific Crest Trail passes through Skamania County.
 Fishing in Skamania County allows for the opportunity to catch certain popular species such as rainbow trout, steelhead and bass.
 The Columbia Gorge Interpretive Center Museum, in Stevenson, examines the geologic and human past in the Columbia River Gorge.
 The Lewis and Clark Expedition passed through Skamania County, and some of their campsites can be visited.
 Historical markers are located in several areas, such as Fort Cascades and Fort Raines, both built in the 1850s to protect the portage road around the Cascades Rapids.
 Kiteboarding and windsurfing are seasonal sports popular in the Columbia River Gorge.

Parks and other protected areas

County parks
Prindle Park is a county-maintained park with picnic facilities and a playground.
Big Cedars Campground is a county-maintained campground with primitive campsites.
Home Valley Campground is another county-maintained camping area.

State parks
Beacon Rock State Park offers hiking, camping, rock climbing, and picnicking facilities.

Sites maintained by the US Forest Service
Sams Walker Day Use Site offers an interpretive trail, access to the Columbia River, and opportunities to view wildlife. Portions of it are typically wheelchair-accessible. However, vegetation growth sometimes prevents people in wheelchairs from using the trails.
St. Cloud Day Use Site features a short, easy trail through a meadow, picnic area, access to the Columbia River and wildlife viewing opportunities.

National protected areas
Franz Lake National Wildlife Refuge
Gifford Pinchot National Forest (part)
Mount St. Helens National Monument (part)
Pierce National Wildlife Refuge
Wind River Arboretum
Wind River Experimental Forest

Communities

Cities
North Bonneville
Stevenson (county seat)

Census-designated place
Carson
Carson River Valley (former)

Unincorporated communities
Cook
Mill A
Skamania
Stabler (also known as Hemlock)
Underwood
West End
Willard

Politics

Skamania County is a fairly competitive county in presidential elections. The Republicans and Democrats won the county four times each between 1988 and 2016.

See also
National Register of Historic Places listings in Skamania County, Washington

References

External links
Official county website

 
1854 establishments in Washington Territory
Populated places established in 1854
Columbia River Gorge
Gifford Pinchot National Forest
Western Washington
Washington placenames of Native American origin